Finnentrop is a Gemeinde (municipality) in Olpe district in North Rhine-Westphalia, Germany.

Geography 
Finnentrop is situated in the Sauerland, near the forks of the rivers Bigge and Lenne. Finnentrop shares borders with Sundern and Eslohe (both part of Hochsauerland district), Lennestadt and Attendorn (both in Olpe district), as well as with Plettenberg (Märkischer Kreis district). Finnentrop is divided into the following constituent communities:

History 
While the municipality of Finnentrop didn't come into being before 1 July 1969, the history of the constituting villages dates back from the Middle Ages. In 1162 Lenhausen and Rönkhausen were mentioned for the first time. Until 13 July 1908, the place now known as Finnentrop had three names: Habbecke, Neubrücke (“Newbridge”) and, once the Ruhr-Sieg railway was built, Bahnhof Finnentrop (“Finnentrop Railway Station”). Neubrücke consisted of only one building at the forks of Bigge and Lenne (Reuters Haus, first mentioned in 1847). The “new bridge” seems to have already been built by 1847, as the “Reuter” had to charge tolls.

The new municipality was cobbled together in 1969 from parts of the old Amt of Serkenrode (Meschede district), the communities of Schliprüthen and Oedingen and parts of Attendorn-Land and Helden. This restructuring also saw the municipality pass from Meschede district (which was abolished in 1974) to Olpe district. The municipality's name is drawn from the original centre of Finnentrop situated a few hundred metres up the Bigge river, now known as Altfinnentrop (“alt” is German for “old”). The ending —trop comes from trop or torp, meaning “village”. The High German word Dorf is a cognate, as is the English word thorpe.

The municipal arms shows a rose under a wavy chevron. The rose stands for the Lords of Finnentrop (von Vinnentrop) and dates back to the year 1358. The chevron stands for the two rivers, the Bigge and the Lenne, which merge in the municipality. The colour green refers to the great swathes of greenery in the municipal area.

Finnentrop maintains partnership arrangements with:
  Diksmuide, Belgium (since 1979);
  Helbra, Saxony-Anhalt (since 1990).

Mayors 
The mayor between 1997 and 2020 was the jurist Dietmar Heß (* 1955) (CDU).
In September 2020 Achim Henkel (CDU) has been elected. The 53 year old first chief police officer used to be in charge of the policestation in Olpe for many years.

Culture and sightseeing

Theatres & Museums 
 Schützenhof Lichtspiele, 1954-vintage movie theater renovated in 2006 with 170 seats
 Heimatstube Schönholthausen (museum)

Buildings 

 St. Georg hall church in (Schliprüthen), dating from before the 12th century
 Romanesque Catholic parish church Mariä Himmelfahrt in Schönholthausen, dating in parts from the 13th century
 Matthiaskapelle chapel in Altfinnentrop from 1383
 Haus Bamenohl castle in Bamenohl (14th century)
 Schloss Ahausen castle close to Heggen
 Schloss Lenhausen castle in Lenhausen (13th century)
 Reiterstellwerk (historic signal box)

Regular events 
 Schützenfest (marksmen's festival) in the larger villages
 Prunksitzung by the Lenhausen Carnival Club (LCC) (revue, Saturday before Altweibertag – Old Women's Day)
 Prunksitzung by the Festkommitee Finnentroper Karneval (revue)
 Waldfest “Im Schee” Finnentrop (“forest festival”, weekend before Whitsun)
 Spritzenfest of the fire station Bamenohl (second weekend in August)
 Open-air concert at Haus Bamenohl (third weekend in August)
 Bürgerfrühschoppen of the fire brigade on German Unity Day
 Christmas market at the town hall (second weekend in Advent)

Economy and infrastructure 
Among the nationally known companies in Finnentrop are Eibach (automotive springs), Metten Fleischwaren (meat processing) and a plant of ThyssenKrupp Steel Europe AG.

Transport 
Finnentrop station is situated at the Ruhr–Sieg railway, from where the Bigge Valley Railway connects to Olpe. The Attendorn-Finnentrop aerodrome  is situated close to the village of Heggen.

Public institutions 
 Rathaus Finnentrop (town hall)
 Erlebnisbad Finto (natatorium)
 Jugendherberge Bamenohl (Germany's first private youth hostel after the Second World War)
 Jugendherberge Heggen (hostel
 Finnentrop volunteer fire brigade with eleven fire stations

Education 
There are six primary schools, one Hauptschule, one Realschule and one Gesamtschule.

Famous people

Honorary citizens 
 Erwin Oberkalkofen, former mayor
 Ernst Vollmer, former municipality director

Sons and daughters of the municipality 
 Gertrud von Plettenberg († 1608), Mistress of Ernest of Bavaria, Prince-elector-archbishop of the Archbishopric of Cologne
 Friedrich Georg Pape (1763−1816), one of the first German democrats
 Johann Joseph Freidhoff (1768−1818), engraver
 Alexander Haindorf (1784–1862), doctor, Jewish reformer, psychologist, university lecturer
 Eduard Bartling (1845−1927), entrepreneur and politician
 Lawrence Becker (1869–1947), lawyer and judge who served as Solicitor of the United States Treasury
 Henry M. Arens (1873−1963), original name Heinrich Martin Arens, politician who served in many offices in Minnesota, including the U.S. House of Representatives
 Josef Baumhoff (1887−1962), German official, newspaper publisher and politician
 Kilian Kirchhoff (1892–1944), priest, translator and dissident
 Erich Feldmann (1929−1998), Priester, Kirchenhistoriker und Augustinusforscher
 Klaus-Dieter Uelhoff (born 1936), politician, member of the Bundestag
 Reinhard Wilhelm (born 1946), scientist
 Paul Scheermann (born 1949), soccer player
 Hilde Mattheis (born 1954), politician, member of the Bundestag

Famous people who have worked in the municipality 
 John A. Roebling (1806−1869), original name Johann August Röbling, civil engineer, designer of the Brooklyn Bridge
 Johannes Dornseiffer (1837−1914), priest, co-founder of many savings and loan companies connected with Friedrich Wilhelm Raiffeisen
 Hermann Hagedorn, (1884–1951), German writer, lyric poet and teacher
 Angela Maria Autsch (1900−1944), nun of the Trinitarian Order, was murdered in the Auschwitz concentration camp

Artists 
 Andreas Schmidt, film actor and theatre director based out of Kreuzberg, Berlin

Further reading 
 Bitter, Franz, Finnentrop Sauerland. Das Pfarrdorf, seine Industrie, der Eisenbahnknotenpunkt und seine Bewohner. Finnentrop 1955. edited by Sasse, R., 2005. 
 Feldmann, Thomas, Die Finnentroper Chronik. Finnentrop 1994.
 Pickert’sche Sammlung, written by Voss, W., edited by Sasse, R., 2005,
 further collection of literature from the Arbeitskreis für Geschichte und Heimatpflege in der Gemeinde Finnentrop e.V.

References

External links 
  

Olpe (district)